, better known as Gene Shinozaki and formerly GVSBeatbox, is a Japanese-American beatboxer, singer-songwriter, street performer, multi-instrumentalist, and music producer. He is currently a member of the beatbox crew Beatbox House and half of the world-champion tag team Spider Horse.

Career
Shinozaki was originally from California but soon moved to Boston to attend Berklee College of Music before dropping out due to disinterest in the program. While touring with his band "DC Wonder" he decided to pursue a career in beatboxing after watching an interview with Reeps One. Over two years he started street performing, began gigging and eventually was featured on the TV show So You Think You Can Dance in the beatbox/dance duo "Movement Box". Shinozaki started beatbox battling in 2013. In 2015 he won the Grand Beatbox Battle in Switzerland He then became sound engineer for Beatbox television and joined the group Beatbox House. In 2017 Shinozaki released his debut album, "Sound and Human". Shinozaki has been ranked among the top 8 beatboxers in the world.

Musical style
Shinozaki is well known for his signature brand of beatboxing which involves performing the role of an entire rock band using vocal percussion, singing, and lip oscillation techniques. He is one of the first beatboxers to pioneer musicality (over technicality) in the world of beatboxing, focusing on emotional melodies and singing in addition to solid technique. He cites Bobby McFerrin as a direct and primary influence on his sound. He also often performs as a singer songwriter, and electronic music producer.

Performance in competitions

Discography

Albums

Mixtape

Singles

As lead artist

As promotional singles

Filmography

Television shows

References 

American beatboxers
Living people
Musicians from New York City
Musicians from Boston
1991 births
Berklee College of Music alumni
Beatbox Battle World Champion